Expedition Airways was an airline based in Zimbabwe which collapsed due to poor management and the difficulty of exploiting the Harare to Johannesburg route dominated by South African Airways and British Airways. It operated to seven domestic destinations, South Africa and Mozambique with Raytheon Beech 1900C airliner aircraft.

Former Code Data
IATA Code: FO
ICAO Code: XPD
Callsign: Expedition

Defunct airlines of Zimbabwe